Ground Zero was a Japanese noise/improvisation band during the 1990s led by the guitarist and "turntablist" Otomo Yoshihide that had a large and rotating group of performers with two other regular performers.

History
Ground Zero was formed to play the John Zorn game piece Cobra. They first played in August 1990 and last played in March 1998. The band's last project was in 1998 when they re-worked material from a 1992 Cassiber concert in Tokyo; it was released on the second CD of Cassiber's double CD, Live in Tokyo (1998).

Musical style
The band performed on such instruments as turntables, sampler, shamisen, saxophone, koto, omnichord, electric guitar and two drum kits. They were the one of the first free improvising musicians to use turntables.

Their music mixed free jazz, improvisation, rock and experimental noise. Their albums include Revolutionary Pekinese Opera ver. 1.28, a sound collage piece combining noise music and samples of peking opera by the Duo Goebbels/Harth, and Consume Red, on which the performers improvise around a short sample of hojok music played by the Korean holy musician Kim Seok Chul.

Discography

Studio albums
 Ground Zero (1992)
 Null & Void (1995)
 Revolutionary Pekinese Opera (1995)
 Revolutionary Pekinese Opera Ver. 1.28 (1996)
 Consume Red (1997)
 Plays Standards (1997)

Compilation albums
 Conflagration (1997)
 Consummation (1998)

Live albums
 Last Concert (1999)
 Live 1992+ (2007)

Singles
 "Live Mao '99" (1995) 
 "Revolutionary Pekinese Opera Ver. 1.50" (1996)

References

External links
 
 
 Ground-Zero at Improvised Music from Japan

Musical groups established in 1990
Musical groups disestablished in 1998
Musical groups from Tokyo
Noise musical groups
Free improvising musicians